The 2015 Canada Women's Sevens was the fourth tournament within the 2014–15 World Rugby Women's Sevens Series. It was held over the weekend of 18 – 19 April 2015 at Westhills Stadium in the Victoria suburb of Langford, British Columbia.

Format
The teams were drawn into three pools of four teams each. Each team played the others teams in their pool once. The top two teams from each pool advanced to the Cup/Plate brackets along with the top two third place teams. The rest of the teams played off in the Bowl bracket.

Teams

Pool Stage

Pool A

Pool B

Pool C

Knockout stage

Bowl

Plate

Cup

References

External links
Draw announcement

2015
2014–15 World Rugby Women's Sevens Series
Sevens
2015 in women's rugby union
Sevens
April 2015 sports events in Canada
Sports competitions in British Columbia